The Yellow Rose is an American soap opera television series that was broadcast on NBC from October 2, 1983 until May 12, 1984. It was produced by Paul Freeman. The series was at least partly inspired by the more coltish elements of the soap opera Dallas, and dealt with the intrigues of the Texas-based Champion family who owned a 200,000-acre cattle and oil ranch called "The Yellow Rose".

The show's cast included Sam Elliott, David Soul, Edward Albert, Cybill Shepherd, Chuck Connors, Noah Beery, Jr., Ken Curtis, Robin Wright and Jane Russell. The Yellow Rose was canceled after one season of twenty-two episodes.

In 1990, the series was rerun again on NBC along with Bret Maverick starring James Garner.

Cast

Episodes

US television ratings

Theme song 
The series' theme song "The Yellow Rose" — set to the tune of the traditional "The Yellow Rose of Texas" but with new lyrics referencing the setting of the show — was recorded by country singers Johnny Lee and Lane Brody. The song became a No. 1 hit on the Billboard Hot Country Singles chart on April 21, 1984.

Home media 
Warner Bros. released the complete series to DVD on May 3, 2011, consisting of all 22 episodes on a five-disc set. The set was released as part of the manufacture-on-demand Warner Archive Collection.

References

External links 
 

1983 American television series debuts
1984 American television series endings
American primetime television soap operas
English-language television shows
NBC original programming
Television series by Warner Bros. Television Studios
Television shows set in Texas
1980s Western (genre) television series